Dyagilevo (also given as Dyagilevo, Ryazan Dyagilevo) is an air base in Ryazan Oblast, Russia, 3 km west of Ryazan. It serves as a training center for Russia's strategic bomber force.

The base is home to the 203rd Guards Orlovsky Independent Aircraft-refuelling Aviation Regiment with the Ilyushin Il-78/78M and the 49th Instructor Red Banner Heavy Bomber Aviation Regiment as part of the 43rd Guards Oryol Center for Combat Employment and Retraining of Long-Range Aviation Flight Personnel.

The Ryazan Museum of Long-Range Aviation is located on the base.

History
In 1955 it was one of only 6 Soviet bases capable of handling the Myasishchev M-4 bomber. In 1967 it had 7 Tupolev Tu-22s used for training. In 1973 it received 2 Tupolev Tu-22M (NATO: Backfire) aircraft. It was also home to 43 TsBPiPLS (43rd Center for Combat Application and Training of Air Crew) which included the Tu-22M, Tupolev Tu-95MS (NATO: Bear), and Tupolev Tu-134UBL (NATO: Crusty) trainer. In 1985 the 49 TBAP (49th Heavy Bomber Aviation Regiment) arrived at Dyagilevo, flying Tu-22M and Tu-95 aircraft and eventually converting into an ITBAP (training regiment). The 49th Regiment was part of the 43rd Centre, and eventually disbanded in 1997.

By 1994 it received 24 Tu-95K (Bear-G) bombers for decommissioning under the START II treaty.  A number of Tu-16, Tu-22, and M-4 aircraft are mothballed here.

As of 2009, the ww2.dk website reported that three units were active at the airbase.
 1st Instructor Heavy Bomber Aviation Squadron (Tu-22M3 and Tu-134)
 2nd Instructor Heavy Bomber Aviation Squadron (Tu-95MS and An-26)
43rd Guards Orlovskiy Center for Combat Employment and Retraining of Personnel

Air Power Review reported in 2004 that the 203rd Independent Orel Air Regiment of Guards (Air Tankers) operating Il-78 and Il-78M was stationed at the base. Formed 6 July 1941 at Monino near Moscow as the 412th Aviation Regiment, with TB-7 (Pe-8) heavy bombers. Renamed 432nd AP several weeks later. Renamed 25th AP DD of Guards 19 September 1943. 1230th AP (SZ) renamed 203rd OAP (SZ) 1 December 1994.

On 5 December 2022, the base was attacked by Ukrainian drones which damaged a Tu-22M3 bomber and destroyed a fuel truck; three personnel were killed and five injured. The Engels Air Force Base was also raided on the same night. On 14 December, a Shahed-136 drone that exploded in Kyiv apartment building had “For Ryazan“ written on it in Russian.

References

Soviet Long Range Aviation bases
Russian Air Force bases